HMS H3 was a British H-class submarine built by Canadian Vickers Co, Montreal. She was laid down on 11 January 1915 and was commissioned on 3 June 1915. After commissioning she crossed the Atlantic from St. John's, Newfoundland to Gibraltar escorted by the armed merchant cruiser . H3 was mined in the Gulf of Cattaro, Adriatic on 15 July 1916.

Design

H3 was fitted with a  Hotchkiss quick-firing gun (6-pounder) and four  torpedo tubes. Its torpedo tubes were fitted to the bows and the submarine was loaded with eight  torpedoes. It is a Holland 602 type submarine but was designed to meet Royal Navy specifications. Its complement was twenty-two crew members.

References

External links
 'Submarine losses 1904 to present day' - Royal Navy Submarine Museum 

 

British H-class submarines
Ships built in Quebec
1915 ships
World War I submarines of the United Kingdom
Royal Navy ship names
Maritime incidents in 1916
World War I shipwrecks in the Adriatic Sea
Ships sunk by mines
Lost submarines of the United Kingdom